Pamisos is a former municipality in Karditsa prefecture, Greece.

Pamisos may also refer to:
 Pamisos (river), a river in Peloponnese, Greece
 Pamisos (Thessaly river), a river in Thessaly, Greece
 Pamisos Messini, a Greek football club in Messini, Messinia